Akiyama Tameike Dam is an earthfill dam located in Yamaguchi prefecture in Japan. The dam is used for irrigation. The catchment area of the dam is 3 km2. The dam impounds about 8  ha of land when full and can store 800 thousand cubic meters of water. The construction of the dam was completed in 1944.

References

Dams in Yamaguchi Prefecture
1944 establishments in Japan